Bulgaria competed at the 2002 Winter Paralympics in Salt Lake City, United States. 1 competitor from Bulgaria won no medals and so did not place in the medal table.

See also 
 Bulgaria at the Paralympics
 Bulgaria at the 2002 Winter Olympics

References 

Bulgaria at the Paralympics
2002 in Bulgarian sport
Nations at the 2002 Winter Paralympics